Charles "Charlie" Owens (born July 31, 1950) is a former professional tennis player from the United States.

Career
Owens won the Orange Bowl in 1966 for the 16 and under age division.

He competed at the 1970 Summer Universiade in Turin, where he won bronze medals in both the men's doubles (with Fred McNair) and mixed doubles (with Mona Schallau).

In 1972 he was the NCAA Division II champion for Samford University.

He made the third round of the singles event at the US Open in 1973 and 1974 as well as the third round of Wimbledon in 1975. In doubles, he and partner Mike Estep beat third seeds Arthur Ashe and Roscoe Tanner en route to the third round at the 1974 US Open.

Grand Prix career finals

Singles: 1 (0–1)

Doubles: 2 (0–2)

References

1950 births
Living people
American male tennis players
Tennis people from Alabama
Universiade medalists in tennis
Universiade bronze medalists for the United States
Samford Bulldogs athletes
College men's tennis players in the United States
Sportspeople from Tuscaloosa, Alabama